Cakov is a village and municipality in the Rimavská Sobota District of the Banská Bystrica Region of southern Slovakia.

History
The village arose in the 13th century. It was first mentioned in 1395 (Chakofalua) when it belonged to the Széchy family. From the 17th century it was the property of Muráň. In 1576 and 1583 it was pillaged by the Turks. From 1938 to 1944 it belonged to Hungary under the First Vienna Award.

Geography
The municipality lies at an altitude of 170 metres and covers an area of 4.294 km². It has a population of 278 people.

Genealogical resources
The records for genealogical research are available at the state archive "Statny Archiv in Banska Bystrica, Slovakia"

 Roman Catholic church records (births/marriages/deaths): 1787-1895 (parish B)

See also
 List of municipalities and towns in Slovakia

External links
https://web.archive.org/web/20071116010355/http://www.statistics.sk/mosmis/eng/run.html
http://www.cakov.ou.sk/

http://www.e-obce.sk/obec/cakov/cakov.html
Surnames of living people in Cakov

Villages and municipalities in Rimavská Sobota District
Hungarian communities in Slovakia